This is a bibliography of works by Mary Shelley (30 August 1797 – 1 February 1851), the British novelist, short story writer, dramatist, essayist, biographer, and travel writer, best known for her Gothic novel Frankenstein: or, The Modern Prometheus (1818). She also edited and promoted the works of her husband, the Romantic poet and philosopher Percy Bysshe Shelley. Until the 1970s, Mary Shelley was known mainly for her efforts to publish Percy Shelley's works and for Frankenstein. Recent scholarship has yielded a more comprehensive view of Mary Shelley’s achievements, however. Scholars have shown increasing interest in her literary output, particularly in her novels, which include the historical novels Valperga (1823) and Perkin Warbeck (1830), the apocalyptic novel The Last Man (1826), and her final two novels, Lodore (1835) and Falkner (1837). Studies of her lesser-known works such as the travel book Rambles in Germany and Italy (1844) and the biographical articles for Dionysius Lardner's Cabinet Cyclopaedia (1829–46) support the growing view that Mary Shelley remained a political radical throughout her life. Mary Shelley's works often argue that cooperation and sympathy, particularly as practised by women in the family, were the ways to reform civil society. This view was a direct challenge to the individualistic Romantic ethos promoted by Percy Shelley and Enlightenment political theories.

Collections of Mary Shelley's papers are housed in The Abinger Collection and The Bodleian Shelley Manuscripts at the Bodleian Library, the New York Public Library (particularly The Carl H. Pforzheimer Collection of Shelley and His Circle), the Huntington Library, the British Library, and in the John Murray Collection.

The following list is based on W. H. Lyles's Mary Shelley: An Annotated Bibliography and Mary Shelley's Literary Lives and Other Writings. It lists first editions of works authored by Mary Shelley, except where indicated.

Novels

Travel narratives

Short stories
—. "A Tale of the Passions, or, the Death of Despina". The Liberal 1 (1822): 289–325.
—. "The Bride of Modern Italy". The London Magazine 9 (1824): 351–363.
—. "Lacy de Vere". Forget Me Not for 1827. 1826.
—. "The Convent of Chailot". The Keepsake for MDCCCXXVIII.
—. "Ferdinando Eboli. A Tale". The Keepsake for MDCCCXXIX. Ed. Frederic Mansel Reynolds. London: Published for the Proprietor, by Hurst, Chance, and Co., and R. Jennings, 1828.
—. "The Mourner". The Keepsake for MDCCCXXX. Ed. Frederic Mansel Reynolds. London: Published for the Proprietor, by Hurst, Chance, and Co., and R. Jennings, 1829.
—. "The Evil Eye. A Tale". The Keepsake for MDCCCXXX. Ed. Frederic Mansel Reynolds. London: Published for the Proprietor, by Hurst, Chance, and Co., and R. Jennings, 1829.
—. "The False Rhyme". The Keepsake for MDCCCXXX. Ed. Frederic Mansel Reynolds. London: Published for the Proprietor, by Hurst, Chance, and Co., and R. Jennings, 1829.
—. "The Swiss Peasant". The Keepsake for MDCCCXXXI. Ed. Frederic Mansel Reynolds. London: Published for the Proprietor, by Hurst, Chance, and Co., and R. Jennings and Chaplin, 1830.
—. "Transformation". The Keepsake for MDCCCXXXI. Ed. Frederic Mansel Reynolds. London: Published for the Proprietor, by Hurst, Chance, and Co., and R. Jennings and Chaplin, 1831.
—. "The Dream, A Tale". The Keepsake for MDCCCXXXII. Ed. Frederick Mansel Reynolds. London: Published by Longman, Rees, Orme, Brown, and Green, 1831.
—. "The Pole". The Court Magazine and Belle Assemblée. 1 (1832): 64–71.
—. "The Brother and Sister, An Italian Story". The Keepsake for MDCCCXXXIII. Ed. Frederick Mansel Reynolds. London: Published by Longman, Rees, Orme, Brown, Green, and Longman/Paris: Rittner and Goupill/Frankfurt: Charles Jügill, 1832.
—. "The Invisible Girl". The Keepsake for MDCCCXXXIII. Ed. Frederick Mansel Reynolds. London: Published by Longman, Rees, Orme, Brown, Green, and Longman/Paris: Rittner and Goupill/Frankfurt: Charles Jũgill, 1832.
—. "The Mortal Immortal". The Keepsake for MDCCCXXXIV. Ed. Frederick Mansel Reynolds. London: Published by Longman, Rees, Orme, Brown, Green, and Longman/Paris: Rittner and Goupill/Berlin: A. Asher, 1833.
—. "The Elder Son". Heath's Book of Beauty. 1835. Ed. Countess of Blessington. London: Longman, Rees, Orme, Brown, Green, and Longman/Paris: Rittner and Goupil/Berling: A. Asher, 1834.
—. "The Trial of Love". The Keepsake for MDCCCXXXV. Ed. Frederick Mansel Reynolds. London: Published for Longman, Rees, Orme, Brown, Green, and Longman/Paris: Rittner and Goupill/Berlin: A. Asher, 1834.
—. "The Parvenue". The Keepsake for MDCCCXXXVII. Ed. The Lady Emmeline Stuart Wortley. London: Published for Longman, Rees, Orme, Green, and Longman/Paris: Delloy and Co., 1836.
—. "The Pilgrims". The Keepsake for MDCCCXXXVIII. London: Published by Longman, Orme, Brown, Green, and Longmans/Paris: delloy and Co., 1837.
—. "Euphrasia: A Tale of Greece". The Keepsake for MDCCCXXXIX. Ed. Frederic Mansel Reynolds. London: Published for Longman, Orme, Brown, Green, and Longmans/Paris: Delloy and Co., 1838.
—. "Roger Dodsworth: The Reanimated Englishman" (1863).
—. "The Heir of Mondolfo".Appleton's Journal: A Monthly Miscellany of Popular Literature (NY) N.S. 2 (1877): 12–23.
—. "Valerius: The Reanimated Roman" (1819).

Children's literature

Articles and reviews
—. "Madame D'Houtetôt". The Liberal 2 (1823): 67–83.
—. "Giovanni Villani". The Liberal 2 (1823): 281–97.
—. "Narrative of a Tour round the Lake of Geneva, and of an Excursion through the Valley of Chamouni". La Belle Assemblée, or Court and Fashionable Magazine NS 28 (1823): 14–19.
—. "Recollections of Italy". The London Magazine 9 (1824): 21–26.
—. "On Ghosts". The London Magazine 9 (1824): 253–56.
—. "Defense of Velluti". The Examiner 958 (11 June 1826): 372–73.
—. "The English in Italy". Westminster Review 6 (1826): 325–41.
—. "Review of The Italian Novelists". Westminster Review 7 (1827): 115–26.
—. "Illyrian Poems – Feudal Scenes". Westminster Review 10 (1829): 71–81.
—. "Modern Italy". Westminster Review 11 (1829): 127–40.
—. "Review of The Loves of the Poets". Westminster Review 11 (1829): 472–77.
—. "Recollections of the Lake of Geneva". The Spirit and Manners of the Age 2 (1829): 913–20.
—. "Review of Cloudesley; a Tale". Blackwood's Edinburgh Magazine 27 (1830): 711–16.
—. "Review of 1572 Chronique du Temps de Charles IX—Par l'Auteur du Theatre de Clara Gazul". Westminster Review 13 (1830): 495–502.
—. "Memoirs of William Godwin". William Godwin. Caleb Williams. London: Colburn and Bentley, 1831.
—. "Review of Thomas Moore. The Life and Death of Lord Edward Fitzgerald". Westminster Review 16 (1831): 110–21.
—. "Living Literary Characters, No. II. The Honourable Mrs. Norton". New Monthly Magazine and Literary Journal 1 (1831): 180–83.
—. "Living Literary Characters, No. IV. James Fenimore Cooper". New Monthly Magazine and Literary Journal 1 (1831): 356–62.
—. "Review of "The Bravo; a Venetian Story. By the Author of 'The Pilot,' 'The Borderers,' etc." [James Fenimore Cooper]. Westminster Review 16 (1832): 180–92. 
—. "Modern Italian Romances, I". Monthly Chronicle (November 1838): 415–28.
—. "Modern Italian Romances, II". Monthly Chronicle (December 1838): 547–57.

Translations
—. "Relation of the Death of the Family of the Cenci". The Poetical Works of Percy Bysshe Shelley. Ed. Mrs. Shelley. 2nd ed. London: Edward Moxon, 1839.

Edited works
Shelley, Percy Bysshe. Posthumous Poems of Percy Bysshe Shelley. London: Printed for John and Henry L. Hunt, 1824.
Trelawny, Edward John. Adventures of a Younger Son. London: Colburn and Bentley, 1831.
Godwin, William, Jr. Transfusion; or, The Orphan of Unwalden. London: Macrone, 1835.
Shelley, Percy Bysshe. The Poetical Works of Percy Bysshe Shelley. Ed. Mrs. Shelley. 4 vols. London: Edward Moxon, 1839. [2nd ed., single vol., 1839] 
Shelley, Percy Bysshe. Essays, Letters from Abroad, Translations and Fragments, by Percy Bysshe Shelley. Ed. Mrs. Shelley. 2 vols. London: Edward Moxon, 1840 [1839].

Biographies

Poems

{| class="wikitable"
|+ 
! Poem !! First publication !! Manuscript !! Attribution !! Composition date
|-
| "Absence; 'Ah! he is gone—and I alone!—'"  || The Keepsake for MDCCCXXXI. Ed. Frederic Mansel Reynolds. London: Published for the Proprietor, by Hurst, Chance, and Co., and Jennings and Chaplin, 1830. || British Library, Ashley MS A 4023, fair copy in MS's handwriting || ||
|-
| "A Dirge; 'This morn, thy gallant bark, love'" || The Keepsake for MDCCCXXXI. Ed. Frederic Mansel Reynolds. London: Published for the Proprietor, by Hurst, Chance, and Co., and Jennings and Chaplin, 1830. || Earliest extant manuscript at Harvard University fMS. Eng. 822, dated November 1827; second manuscript in a letter MS wrote to Maria Gisborne on 11 June 1835 || || November 1827 and 11 June 1835
|-
| "A Night Scene; 'I see thee not, my gentlest Isabel'" || The Keepsake for MDCCCXXXI. Ed. Frederic Mansel Reynolds. London: Published for the Proprietor, by Hurst, Chance, and Co., and Jennings and Chaplin, 1830. || || Published anonymously in the Keepsake, first attributed by Nitchie and confirmed by Palacio through a sales catalogue listing an autograph poem called "A Night Scene" ||
|-
| "Song; 'When I'm no more, this harp that rings'" || The Keepsake for MDCCCXXXI. Ed. Frederic Mansel Reynolds. London: Published for the Proprietor, by Hurst, Chance, and Co., and Jennings and Chaplin, 1830. || ||This poem is included in Lyles's bibliography but not in the more recent Markley edition of MS's works.||
|-
| "The Death of Love" || Bennett, Betty T. "Newly Uncovered Letters and Poems by Mary Wollstonecraft Shelley". Keats-Shelley Journal 46 (1997): 51–74. || The only surviving manuscript, dated 19 November 1831, is found in an autograph album owned by Birkbeck, University of London and entitled "Mrs. G. Birkbeck / ALBUM / September, MDCCCXXV".|| This poem is listed in Markley but not in Lyles. || 19 November 1831
|-
| "To Love in Solitude and Mystery" || The Keepsake for MDCCCXXXIII. Ed. Frederic Mansel Reynolds. London: Longmans, Rees, Orme, Brown and Green, 1832. || Pforzheimer Collection, New York Public Library || Published anonymously. Attribution was first suggested by Emily W. Sunstein and confirmed in Bennett, Betty T. "Newly Uncovered Letters and Poems by Mary Wollstonecraft Shelley". Keats-Shelley Journal 46 (1997): 51–74. This poem is included in Markley's edition of MS's works but not in Lyles's bibliography. ||
|-
| "I Must Forget Thy Dark Eyes' Love-Fraught Gaze" || The Keepsake for MDCCCXXXIII. Ed. Frederic Mansel Reynolds. London: Longmans, Rees, Orme, Brown and Green, 1832. || Berg Collection, New York Public Library || Published anonymously. Attributed by Emily Sunstein. This poem is included in Markley's edition of MS's works but not in Lyles's bibliography. ||
|-
| "Ode to Ignorance; 'Hail, Ignorance! majestic queen!'" || The Metropolitan Magazine 9 (1834): 29–31. || || This poem is included in Lyles's bibliography but not in the more recent Markley edition of MS's works. ||
|-
| "Fame" || The Drawing-Room Scrap-Book. 1835. 1834. || || This poem is included in Lyles's bibliography but not in the more recent Markley edition of MS's works. ||
|-
| "How like a star you rose upon my life" || The Keepsake for MDCCCXXXIX. Ed. Frederick Mansel Reynolds. London: Published for Longman, Orme, Brown, Green, and Longmans/Paris: Delloy and Co., 1838. || || ||
|-
| "To the Death; 'O, Come to me in dreams, my love'" || The Keepsake for MDCCCXXXIX. Ed. Frederic Mansel Reynolds. London: Longman, Orme, Brown, Green, and Longmans, 1839. || Collection of Samuel Loveman || || 15 December 1834
|-
| "Oh Listen While I sing to Thee," Canzonet, With Accompaniment for the Harp or Piano Forte, Composed and Inscribed to his Friend Berry King, Esqr. by Henry Hugh Pearson, Professor of Music in the University of Edinburgh || London: D'Almaine and Co. [c.1842] || Bodleian Library and British Library || || 12 March 1838
|-
| The Choice. a Poem on Shelley's Death by Mary Wollstonecraft Shelley || Ed. Harry Buxton Forman. London: Printed for the Editor for Private Distribution, 1876. || Two versions of the poem exist: One is the Forman edition, drawn from a manuscript sent to Forman, and the other is in MS's journal (Ab. Dep. 311/4, pp. 100–06). || || May – July 1823
|-
| "On Reading Wordsworth's Lines on Peel  Castle; 'It is with me, as erst with you" || Grylls, Rosalie Glynn. Mary Shelley: A Biography. London: Oxford University Press, 1938. || Two manuscripts survive, both dated 8 December 1825: Ab. Dep. c. 516 and Ab. Dep. d. 311/4. The second manuscript version was published in Grylls. || || 8 December 1825
|-
| "Fragment; (To Jane with the Last [Man]) 'Tribute for thee, dear solace of my life'" || Grylls, Rosalie Glynn. Mary Shelley: A Biography. London: Oxford University Press, 1938. || Ab. Dep. d. 311/4, p. 109 || || c. 23 January 1826
|-
| "Tempo e' piu di Morire/Io ho tardato piu ch' i' non vorrei: 'Sadly borne across the waves'''" || Ed. Elizabeth Nitchie. Mary Shelley: Author of Frankenstein. New Brunswick: Rutgers University Press, 1953. || Bodleian MS Shelley adds. c. 5, f. 101 || || 1833
|-
| "La Vida es sueño; 'The tide of Time was at my feet'" || 1833 version published by Jean de Palacio in 1969; 1834 version published in Ed. Elizabeth Nitchie. Mary Shelley: Author of Frankenstein. New Brunswick: Rutgers University Press, 1953. || Personal collection of Jean de Palacio and Bodleian MS Shelley adds. c. 5, f. 101 || || 26 July 1833 and 1834 
|-
| "Fair Italy! Still Shines Thy Sun as Bright" || Bennett, Betty T. "Newly Uncovered Letters and Poems by Mary Wollstonecraft Shelley". Keats-Shelley Journal 46 (1997): 51–74. || Fales Manuscript Collection, Fales Library, New York University || This poem is included in Markley's edition of MS's works but not in Lyles's bibliography. || 10 September 1833
|}

Journals and letters
—. The Journals of Mary Shelley, 1814–44. Ed. Paula R. Feldman and Diana Scott-Kilvert. Baltimore: Johns Hopkins University Press, 1995. .
—. The Letters of Mary Wollstonecraft Shelley. 3 vols. Ed. Betty T. Bennett. Baltimore: Johns Hopkins University Press, 1980. .

Fragments

Notes

Bibliography
Crook, Nora, Gen. ed. Mary Shelley's Literary Lives and Other Writings. 4 vols. London: Pickering & Chatto, 2002. .
Crook, Nora, Gen. ed. The Novels and Selected Works of Mary Shelley. 8 vols. London: Pickering & Chatto, 1996. .
Lyles, W. H. Mary Shelley: An Annotated Bibliography. New York: Garland Publishing, 1975. .
Robinson, Charles E., Ed. Mary Shelley: Collected Tales and Stories.'' Baltimore: Johns Hopkins University Press, 1976. .

External links

Mary Shelley chronology and bibliography (part of Romantic Circles)

Posthumous Poems (1824) from Google Books
Essays, Letters from Abroad, Translations and Fragments (1840) from Google Books
The Poetical Works of Percy Bysshe Shelley (1840) from Google Books

Bibliographies by writer
Bibliographies of British writers
Science fiction bibliographies
Horror fiction bibliographies